Orsomarso is a town and comune in the province of Cosenza in the Calabria region of southern Italy. Colombian Categoría Primera B football club Orsomarso S.C. was named after the town.

References

External links 
 News online about Orsomarso on Abystron.org

Cities and towns in Calabria